Al-Bejaa (Arabic: البجاع) is a Syrian village in the Qatana District of the Rif Dimashq Governorate. According to the Syria Central Bureau of Statistics (CBS), Al-Bejaa had a population of 1,058 in the 2004 census.

References

External links

Populated places in Qatana District